Norton Barnhill (born July 15, 1953) is a retired American basketball player. Barnhill was a shooting guard, he played collegiately for Washington State University.

Barnhill played for the Seattle SuperSonics in the NBA for four games during the 1976–77 season. He later played professionally for the Anchorage Northern Knights.

External links 
 

1953 births
Living people
Anchorage Northern Knights players
Basketball players from Winston-Salem, North Carolina
Seattle SuperSonics draft picks
Seattle SuperSonics players
Shooting guards
Washington State Cougars men's basketball players
American men's basketball players